Arsen Cebrzyński (8 March 1912 – 11 September 1940) was a aircraft pilot who served in the Polish Air Force, French Air Force and Royal Air Force. In the Polish Air Force and the French Air Force, he had the rank of lieutenant, and in the Royal Air Force, he had the rank of flying officer. He had fought in the World War II, including the Invasion of Poland, Battle of France and the Battle of Britain.

History 
He was born on 8 March 1912, in Batumi, Russian Empire, now located in Georgia In 1918, his family moved with him to Warsaw in, newly established, Second Polish Republic. In 1932, he had joined the Polish Air Force University in Dęblin. On 4 August 1934, the president of Poland, Ignacy Mościcki, had given him the rank of second lieutenant, with the officer seniority from 15 August 1934, placing him at the 17th position in the aeronautics officer corps. The minister of military matters, Józef Piłsudski, had placed him in the 1st Aviation Regiment of the Polish Air Force. In 1936, he had graduated from the Pilot Academy in Grudziądz, after which, he got assigned to the 111th Fighter Escadrille. On 19 March 1938, he got promoted to the lieutenant, with the officer seniority placing him at 46th place in the lineal group of the aviation officer corps. During the Invasion of Poland by Nazi Germany in September 1939, he was one of the first pilots on the Polish side to destroy enemy planes. On 3 September, he had destroyed Messerschmitt Bf 109, and together with Zdzisław Krasnodębski and Mirosław Ferić, had destroyed Messerschmitt Bf 110. On 5 September, he, together with others, had destroyed Junkers Ju 87.

After the fall of Poland, he had evacuated via Romania to France, where he joined the Groupe de Chasse II/6 of the French Air Force, becoming the leader of Frontal Group Ce, equipped with Bloch MB.150 fighter aircraft. He participated in the Battle of France, during which, he had destroyed 1 and 5/6 of the plane. On 5 June 1940, he had destroyed one Heinkel He 111, and shared another shot down of the same model with Zdzisław Henneberg. On 15 June, together with 2 other pilots, he had destroyed the Henschel Hs 126 plane.

After the fall of France, he had evacuated to the United Kingdom via Oran, French Algeria, and arrived in England on 7 July 1940. He got assigned to the No. 303 Squadron of the Royal Air Force, arriving in Northolt on 21 August 1940. He had his first combat flight for the squadron on 11 September 1940, during which, he had piloted Hawker Hurricane no. V6667/RF-K. The squadron took off from the airbase around 15:30 to intercept the enemy formations over the Horsham area. During the flight, he probably had destroyed the Dornier Do 17 bomber. Later, his plane got badly damaged during the fight, and he himself got badly wounded, and around 16:15, his plane had crashed at the Hitchens Farm in Pembury, England. His body was found near his crashed plane, probably falling from the machine, before it touched the ground. He was buried at the Northwood Cemetery, London.

Military ranks

Polish Air Force 
  Second lieutenant (1934–1938)
  lieutenant (1938–1940)

Royal Air Force 
  flying officer

Awards 
 Pilot Field Badge
 Cross of Valour (double)
 Aviation Medal

Air combat achievements 
Jan Kowalski is classified as 124th at the Bajan's list of flying aces of Poland during World War II, with 2 1/6 confirmed destroyed planes.

Confirmed destroyed planes 
 Messerschmitt Bf 109 on 3 September 1939. 
 1/2 Messerschmitt Bf 110 on 3 September 1939. Together with Zdzisław Krasnodębski and Mirosław Ferić
 1/? Junkers Ju 87 on 5 September 1939.
 Heinkel He 111 on 5 June 1940 while piloting Bloch MB.150.
 1/2 Heinkel He 111 on 5 June 1940 while piloting Block MB.150. Together with Zdzisław Henneberg
 1/3 Henschel Hs 126 on 15 June 1940.

Probably destroyed planes 
 Dornier Do 17 on 11 September 1940 while piloting Hawker Hurricane no. V6667/RF-K.

Citations

References

Bibliography 
 Dziennik Personalny Ministerstwa Spraw Wojskowych, no. 12. 15 August 1934. p. 215, 224.
 Ryszard Rybka, Kamil Stepan, Rocznik oficerski 1939. Stan na dzień 23 marca 1939. Kraków: Fundacja CDCN, 2006. ISBN 978-83-7188-899-1.
 Richard King: Dywizjon 303. Walka i codzienność. Warszawa: Wydawnictwo RM, 2012. ISBN 978-83-7243-979-6
  W. Król, Walczyłem pod niebem Francji, Warsaw, 1984.

1912 births
1940 deaths
People from Batumi
People from Warsaw
Polish World War II flying aces
Polish Army officers
Royal Air Force officers
French Air Force personnel of World War II
Polish Royal Air Force pilots of World War II
Polish September Campaign participants
The Few
Recipients of the Cross of Valour (Poland)
Royal Air Force personnel killed in World War II